"In and Out" is a song written and produced by Willie Hutch. It was released as a single in 1982 by Motown Records. Its B-side was a song called "Brother's Gonna Work It Out" which was featured in the 1973 blaxploitation film The Mack. The single itself peaked at number 29 on the Billboard Dance chart, number 55 on the Black Singles chart and number 51 on the British pop chart.

The song was included as a bonus track on a 2017 reissue of Hutch's 1985 album Making A Game Out Of Love, released by SoulMusic Records.

Fellow Motown artist Junior Walker also recorded a version of the song for his 1982 album Blow The House Down.

Track listing

1982 release  
7" vinyl
 US: Motown / 4501MG

Personnel 
Composer, arrangement, producer: Willie Hutch for Stone Diamond Music Corp.

Chart performance

References 

1982 singles
1982 songs
Songs written by Willie Hutch
Motown singles